Magomed "The Propeller" Magomedov (born June 4, 1982 in Dagestan) is a Russian former kickboxer fighting out of Chinuk Gyn from Minsk, Belarus. He was six time amateur Russian kickboxing champion and the professional WMC and IMF Light Heavyweight World Muay Thai Champion.

Biography and career 

Magomed Magomedov is an ethnic Avar, he was born in Makhachkala, Dagestan. Before turning pro he had over 100 wins as an amateur, was a two time Amateur World champion, European champion and six time Russian champion. He turned pro in 2001 and moved to Bangkok, Thailand.  Started training at the Rompo Gym with his brothers Arslan and Alipdek Magomedov who both are professional fighters as well.

His first professional WMC World title match was in 2004, against Australian Nathan Corbett. Magomedov lost the five round battle by unanimous decision. A month later he moved up a weight class and won the WMC World Title against Clifton Brown.

In 2006 on his rookie year in K-1, he won two tournaments in Sweden and in Czech Republic and qualified for K-1 World GP 2007 in Amsterdam.

On August 12, 2006 he was scheduled to participate at K-1 World Grand Prix 2006 in Las Vegas II but the last moment visa problems kept him out of the United States. He was replaced by Gary Goodridge.

On November 2, 2007 at K-1 Fighting Network Turkey 2007 Magomedov fought against Gökhan Saki. After the fight there was a misunderstanding between both fighters, when Saki kicked him at the end of the match to instigate that he wants to hug him. Magomedov however, thought it was unsportsmanlike, and gave Saki a head butt. Then a brawl ensued, between trainers and managers, but ultimately, everything was settled and the two fighters gave each other a hand. Magomedov lost by unanimous decision.

Titles 

Professional
2007 K-1 Rules Heavyweight Tournament in Turkey champion -100 kg
2007 K-1 Fighting Network Prague champion -100 kg
2006 K-1 Rules "Le Grand Tournoi" runner up -100 kg
2006 K-1 Scandinavia Grand Prix champion -100 kg
2005 King's Birthday WMC-S1 Tournament Champion -90 kg 
2005 I.M.F. world champion in Hong Kong
2005 PK1 Camp (Phuket) champion
2004 King's Birthday runner up in Bangkok
2004 W.M.C. Muaythai world champion -79.5 kg
2003 W.B.K.F. Golden Panther Cup champion -81 kg

Amateur
2004 W.A.K.O. European Championships  -81 kg (Thai-boxing)
2001 Russian Thaiboxing champion 
2000 Russian Thaiboxing champion 
2000 European Thaiboxing champion 
1999 World Amateur Muay Thai champion 
1999 Russian Thaiboxing champion 
1998 Russian Kickboxing champion

Professional fight record

|-  style="background:#fbb;"
| 11.02.2007 || Loss||align=left| Gokhan Saki || K-1 Fighting Network Turkey 2007 || Istanbul, Turkey || Decision (Unanimous) || 3 || 3:00
|-  style="background:#fbb;"
| 10.06.2007 || Loss||align=left| Alban Galonnier || TK2 World MAX 2007 || Aix en Provence, France || Decision || 5|| 2:00
|-  style="background:#cfc;"
| 09.07.2007|| Win ||align=left| Petar Majstorovic || Night of Fighters 4 || Bratislava, Slovakia || Decision || 3 || 3:00
|-  style="background:#fbb;"
| 06.23.2007 || Loss||align=left| Bjorn Bregy || K-1 World GP 2007 in Amsterdam || Amsterdam, Holland || KO (Punches)|| 2 || 2:12
|-
! style=background:white colspan=9 |
|-  style="background:#cfc;"
| 06.23.2007|| Win ||align=left| Maxim Neledva || K-1 World GP 2007 in Amsterdam || Amsterdam, Holland || Decision (Unanimous)|| 3 || 3:00
|-  style="background:#cfc;"
| 05.25.2007|| Win ||align=left| Ricardo van den Bos || K-1 Ringmasters Fight Night || Istanbul, Turkey || TKO (Corner stoppage)|| 3 ||
|-  style="background:#cfc;"
| 03.10.2007|| Win ||align=left| Stefan Leko || K-1 Fighting Network Croatia 2007|| Split, Croatia || Etx.R Decision (Unanimous)|| 4 || 3:00
|-  style="background:#cfc;"
| 01.16.2007|| Win ||align=left| Kaoklai Kaennorsing || K-1 Rules Heavyweight Tournament 2007 in Turkey|| Istanbul, Turkey || KO (Knee Strike)|| 1 || 2:59
|-
! style=background:white colspan=9 |
|-  style="background:#cfc;"
| 01.16.2007|| Win ||align=left| Yahya Gulay || K-1 Rules Heavyweight Tournament 2007 in Turkey|| Istanbul, Turkey || TKO (Low kicks)|| 2 || 1:14
|-  style="background:#cfc;"
| 12.16.2006|| Win ||align=left| Petar Majstorovic || K-1 Fighting Network Prague Round '07|| Prague, Czech Republic || Decision || 3 || 3:00
|-
! style=background:white colspan=9 |
|-  style="background:#cfc;"
| 12.16.2006|| Win ||align=left| Koos Wessels || K-1 Fighting Network Prague Round '07|| Prague, Czech Republic || Decision || 3 || 3:00
|-  style="background:#cfc;"
| 12.16.2006|| Win ||align=left| Adnan Redzovic || K-1 Fighting Network Prague Round '07|| Prague, Czech Republic || Decision || 3 || 3:00
|-  style="background:#c5d2ea;"
| 11.24.2006 || Draw ||align=left| Rickard Nordstrand || K-1 World MAX North European Qualification 2007|| Stockholm, Sweden || Ext.R Draw || 4 || 3:00
|-  style="background:#fbb;"
| 05.26.2006 || Loss||align=left| Igor Jurković || Le Grand Tournoi`06, Final || Paris, France || Decision || 3 || 3:00
|-
! style=background:white colspan=9 |
|-  style="background:#cfc;"
| 05.26.2006|| Win ||align=left| Stephane Gomis|| Le Grand Tournoi`06, Semi final || Paris, France || Decision || 3 || 3:00
|-  style="background:#cfc;"
| 05.26.2006|| Win ||align=left| Petr Kalenda|| Le Grand Tournoi`06, Quarter final || Paris, France || KO ||  || 
|-  style="background:#cfc;"
| 05.20.2006|| Win ||align=left| Rickard Nordstrand|| K-1 Scandinavia Grand Prix 2006 || Stockholm, Sweden || Decision (Unanimous)|| 3 || 3:00
|-
! style=background:white colspan=9 |
|-  style="background:#cfc;"
| 05.20.2006|| Win ||align=left| Errol Zimmerman|| K-1 Scandinavia Grand Prix 2006 || Stockholm, Sweden || Decision (Unanimous)|| 3 || 3:00
|-  style="background:#cfc;"
| 05.20.2006|| Win ||align=left| Michael McDonald|| K-1 Scandinavia Grand Prix 2006 || Stockholm, Sweden || Decision (Unanimous)|| 3 || 3:00
|-  style="background:#cfc;"
| 12.15.2005|| Win ||align=left| Mohamed Caesar|| One Songchai Tsunai Show || Pattaya, Thailand || TKO || 3 ||
|-  style="background:#cfc;"
| 12.05.2005|| Win ||align=left| Igor Jurković|| King's Birthday: Le Grand Tournoi`06 qualification, Final || Bangkok, Thailand || Decision || 3 || 3:00
|-
! style=background:white colspan=9 |
|-  style="background:#cfc;"
| 12.05.2005|| Win ||align=left| Teodor Sariyev|| King's Birthday: Le Grand Tournoi`06 qualification, Semi final || Bangkok, Thailand || Decision (Majority)|| 3 || 3:00
|-  style="background:#cfc;"
| 09.09.2005|| Win ||align=left| Nuengtrakarn Por. Muang U-bon|| Xplosion 2005|| Hong Kong, China || KO (Punches)|| 1 || 
|-
! style=background:white colspan=9 |
|-  style="background:#fbb;"
| 06.25.2005 || Loss||align=left| Nathan Corbett || K-1 Challenge 2005 Xplosion X || Sydney, Australia || Decision (Unanimous)|| 5 || 3:00
|-
! style=background:white colspan=9 |
|-  style="background:#cfc;"
| 12.05.2004|| Win ||align=left| Apichai Tor. Prapadeang|| King's Birthday: Le Grand Tournoi`05 qualification, Final || Bangkok, Thailand || TKO (Kicks)|| 3 || 
|-
! style=background:white colspan=9 |
|-  style="background:#cfc;"
| 12.05.2004|| Win ||align=left| Nikolay Knyazev|| King's Birthday: Le Grand Tournoi`05 qualification, Semi final || Bangkok, Thailand || Decision || 3 || 3:00
|-  style="background:#cfc;"
| 06.17.2004|| Win ||align=left| Clifton Brown||   || Bangkok, Thailand || Decision || 5 || 3:00
|-
! style=background:white colspan=9 |
|-  style="background:#fbb;"
| 05.16.2004 || Loss||align=left| Nathan Corbett ||   || Hong Kong, China || Decision || 5 || 3:00
|-
! style=background:white colspan=9 |
|-  style="background:#fbb;"
| 03.04.2004 || Loss||align=left| John Wayne Parr || S-1 World Championships, Quarter final || Bangkok, Thailand || Decision || 5 || 3:00
|-  style="background:#cfc;"
| 12.29.2003|| Win ||align=left| Zabit Samedov|| Golden Panther Cup, Final|| Moscow, Russia || Decision (Split)|| 8 || 2:00
|-
! style=background:white colspan=9 |
|-  style="background:#fbb;"
| 12.05.2003 || Loss||align=left| Ashwin Balrak || King's Birthday: Le Grand Tournoi`04 qualification, Final || Bangkok, Thailand || Decision || 3 || 3:00
|-
! style=background:white colspan=9 |
|-  style="background:#cfc;"
| 12.05.2003|| Win ||align=left| Roman Lopez|| King's Birthday: Le Grand Tournoi`04 qualification, Semi final || Bangkok, Thailand || KO || 2 || 
|-  style="background:#cfc;"
| 11.26.2003|| Win ||align=left| Faisal Zakaria|| Golden Panther Cup, Semi final || Moscow, Russia || Decision (Unanimous) || 5 || 2:00
|-  style="background:#cfc;"
| 11.26.2003|| Win ||align=left| Dimirty Borulko|| Golden Panther Cup, Quarter final || Moscow, Russia || Decision (Unanimous)|| 3 || 3:00
|-  style="background:#cfc;"
| 09.10.2003|| Win ||align=left| Yuri Barashyan|| Golden Panther Cup, Final || Moscow, Russia || TKO (Low kicks)|| || 
|-
! style=background:white colspan=9 |
|-  style="background:#cfc;"
| 07.16.2003|| Win ||align=left| Maxim Neledva|| Golden Panther Cup, Semi final || Moscow, Russia || Decision (Unanimous)|| 3 || 3:00
|-  style="background:#cfc;"
| 07.16.2003|| Win ||align=left| Vitaly Shemetov|| Golden Panther Cup, Quarter final || Moscow, Russia || Decision (Unanimous)|| 3 || 3:00
|-  style="background:#cfc;"
| 06.18.2003|| Win ||align=left| Dmitry Shakuta|| WBKF Superfights @ Club Arbat || Moscow, Russia || Decision || 5 || 3:00
|-  style="background:#fbb;"
| 05.04.2001 || Loss||align=left| Gasper Cajner || Muaythai Gala Novo Mest || Novo Mesto, Slovenia || Decision || 5 || 3:00
|-
| colspan=9 | Legend:

Amateur fight record

|-  style="background:#cfc;"
| 03.13.2003|| Win ||align=left| Mohamed Azouam|| IAMTF World Championships || Bangkok, Thailand || ||  || 
|-
! style=background:white colspan=9 |
|-
| colspan=9 | Legend:

See also
List of male kickboxers

References

External links
K-1 Official website
Team Magomedov Highlight

1982 births
Living people
Russian male kickboxers
Heavyweight kickboxers
Russian Muay Thai practitioners
Avar people
Russian male mixed martial artists
Dagestani mixed martial artists
Mixed martial artists utilizing Muay Thai
Mixed martial artists utilizing kickboxing
Sportspeople from Makhachkala